"Emergency" is a song by Swedish electropop duo Icona Pop, taken from the EP of the same name. It was released on 26 May 2015 by TEN Music Group and Atlantic. "Emergency" features uncredited vocals from Swedish singer Erik Hassle. The music video directed by B. Åkerlund, Jonas Åkerlund's wife, in collaboration with design duo KTZ was premiered on June 17.

Track listing

Credits and personnel
 Lead vocals – Icona Pop
 Vocals – Erik Hassle
 Additional vocals – Teddy Geiger
 Lyrics – Aino Jawo, Antonio Puntillo, Caroline Hjelt, Diego Leoni, Eric Frederic, Erik Hassle, Gianfranco Bortolotti, Luca Citandini, Teddy Geiger, Tom Peyton
 Producer, programmer, piano – Ricky Reed
 Recorded by – Elysian Park
 Engineer – Ethan Shumaker
 Mixer – Manny Marroquin
 Assistant mix engineer – Chris Galland, Ike Schultz
 Masterer – Chris Gehringer
 Label: TEN Music Group - Big Beat - Atlantic Records

Charts

Weekly charts

Year-end charts

Certifications

See also
 List of number-one dance singles of 2015 (U.S.)

References

2015 singles
2015 songs
Icona Pop songs
Songs written by Aino Jawo
Songs written by Caroline Hjelt
Songs written by Erik Hassle
Songs written by Teddy Geiger
Songs written by Ricky Reed
Atlantic Records singles
Big Beat Records (American record label) singles
Songs written by Gianfranco Bortolotti
Dance-pop songs
Electro swing songs